Coonambula is a locality in the North Burnett Region, Queensland, Australia.

Geography 
The locality is bounded to the east by the Burnett River.

Education 
There are no schools in the locality. The nearest primary schools are in Mundubbera and Eidsvold.

References 

North Burnett Region
Localities in Queensland